Hany Mahfouz Helal was the Egyptian Minister of Higher Education and State Minister for Scientific Research. Helal served as the Cultural and Scientific Chancellor in the Egyptian embassy in Paris.

Helal worked as professor in the Faculty of Engineering, Cairo University (1993), and the Head of Singor University, Alexandria (October 2004). He was as an expert in Earth Sciences Programs of the UNESCO's regional office in Cairo (1993), and the UNESCO consultant of International Laboratory for Scantron, Jordan (2002).

Helal graduated from the Faculty of Engineering at Cairo University with a B.Sc. in Engineering (with honors) in 1974, and he holds a PhD degree in Earth Sciences (Rock Mechanics and Engineering).

References

Living people
Cairo University alumni
Academic staff of Cairo University
Higher education ministers of Egypt
Year of birth missing (living people)
Place of birth missing (living people)
Recipients of the Order of Merit of the Federal Republic of Germany